Turkey took part in the Eurovision Song Contest for the second time in 1978. The country was represented by Nilüfer and Nazar with the song "Sevince" written by Hulki Aktunç and composed by Dağhan Baydur and Onno Tunç. The entry was chosen during a national final called Şarkı Yarışması. It came 18th in the Eurovision 1978.

Before Eurovision

Şarkı Yarışması 
The Turkish entry for the Eurovision Song Contest 1978 was chosen during a national final called Şarkı Yarışması. The national final featured a semi-final on 18 December 1977 and a final on 5 February 1978. 232 songs were submitted to TRT and 12 were selected by a selection committee for the national final.

Semi-final 
The semi-final took place on 18 December 1977 at the Orkut TV Studios in Ankara. The top five entries determined by an expert jury proceeded to the final.

Final 
The final took place on 9 February 1978 at the Orkut TV Studios in Ankara, hosted by Bülend Özveren. The five entries that qualified from the preceding semi-final competed, and the winner was determined by an expert jury.

At Eurovision

Voting

References 

1978
Countries in the Eurovision Song Contest 1978
Eurovision